Mark Lockheart (born 31 March 1961) is a British jazz tenor saxophonist who was a member of the Loose Tubes big band during the 1980s.

Career
After the demise of Loose Tubes, Lockheart formed jazz/folk quartet Perfect Houseplants with Huw Warren, Dudley Phillips, and Martin France. The band released five albums, including two with The Orlando Consort. At this time Lockheart The Scratch Band, performing his compositions. The group recorded two albums, including Imaginary Dances. In 2005 Lockheart put together his "Big Idea" to record the album Moving Air.

In 2003, Lockheart joined the British jazz quintet Polar Bear. The group have recorded six albums, including Held on the Tips of Fingers, which was nominated for the Mercury Award and was selected one of the 100 Jazz Albums That Shook the World by Jazzwise magazine.

A project of more of Lockheart's compositions was released in 2009 with the In Deep Quintet featuring Liam Noble and Jasper Hoiby. The next year, Lockheart was awarded Jazz Musician of the Year award at the All Party Parliamentary Jazz Awards. His compositions have been recorded with the NDR Big Band.

Ellington in Anticipation was released to critical acclaim in 2013. As a septet featuring Sebastian Rochford, Tom Herbert, Liam Noble, Margrit Hasler, James Allsopp, and Finn Peters, Lockheart completed a UK wide tour supported by the Arts Council of England.

In July 2014 Lockheart formed the trio Malija with pianist Liam Noble and bassist Jasper Hoiby as a result of a request from the Rochester Jazz Festival in New York. "Malija" released its debut album entitled The Day I Had Everything on the Edition record label in 2015.

Most recently Lockheart has completed a major jazz/orchestral work titled Days On Earth for jazz sextet and 30-piece orchestra, released on Edition Records in January 2019. 

Lockheart has also played in sessions with Radiohead, Prefab Sprout, and Stereolab. 

Lockheart teaches at Trinity Laban Conservatoire of Music and Dance, Guildhall School of Music and Drama, Royal Academy of Music in London, and is a regular tutor for the National Youth Jazz Collective.

Awards and honors
 1998 Peter Whittingham Award for Young Musicians for Through Rose Coloured Glasses
 2001 Touring grant for the Arts for "Imaginary Dances" by the Arts Council of England
 2005 Touring grant for the Arts for "The Big Idea" by the Arts Council of England
 2010 Jazz Musician of the Year, All Party Parliamentary Jazz Awards
 2013 Jazz CD of the Year for Ellington in Anticipation, Mojo magazine
 2013 Touring grant for the Arts for "Ellington in Anticipation" by the Arts Council of England
 2014 Jazz Electives Composer, THSH and Birmingham Music Service, 'Are We There Yet' commission.
 2016 Jazz FM Instrumentalist of the year
2019 Composer Award from Paul Hamlyn Foundation Awards for Artists

Discography

As leader
 Matheran (1993)
 Through Rose-Coloured Glasses (1998)
 Imaginary Dances (2002)
 Moving Air (2005)
 In Deep (2009)
 Days Like These (2010)
 Ellington in Anticipation (2013)
 The Day I Had Everything (Malija) (2015)
 Instinct (Malija) (2017)
 Days On Earth (2019)

As sideman
With Django Bates
 Summer Fruits (and Unrest) (JMT, 1993)
 Winter Truce (and Homes Blaze) (JMT, 1995)

With Loose Tubes
 Loose Tubes (1985)
 Delightful Precipice (1986)
 Open Letter (1988)
 Dancing on Frith Street (1989)
 Sad Africa (1989)
 Arriving (2015)

With Perfect Houseplants
 Perfect Houseplants (1992)
 Clec (1994)
 Snap Clatter (1997)
 New Folk Songs (2000)
 Extempore (1999) with the Orlando Consort 
 Extempore 2 (2002) with the Orlando Consort 

With Polar Bear
 Dim Lit (2005)
 Held on the Tips of Fingers (2007)
 Polar Bear (2008)
 Peepers (2010)
 In Each and Every One (2014)
 Same as You (2015)

With June Tabor
 Angel Tiger  (1992)
 Against the Streams  (1994)
 Aleyn  (1997)
 A Quiet Eye (1999)

With Huw Warren
 Barrel Organ Far from Home (1997)
 Hundreds of Things a Boy Can Make (1998)
 God Only Knows (2005)

With others
 Prefab Sprout, Steve McQueen (1985)
 Steve Berry, Trio (1988)
 Jah Wobble, Rising Above Bedlam (1991)
 High Llamas, Hawaii (1996)
 Stereolab, Fluoresences (1996)
 John Parricelli, Alba (2000)
 Radiohead, Kid A (2000)
 Colin Towns, Blue Touch Paper (2011)
 Colin Towns, Drawing Breath (2013)
 Kenny Wheeler and Norma Winstone, Mirrors (2013)
 Nikki Iles and Norma Winstone, The Printmakers – Westerly (2015)
 Jasper Høiby, Fellow Creatures (2016)

References

External links
 Official site

1961 births
Living people
21st-century saxophonists
British jazz composers
Jazz tenor saxophonists
Delightful Precipice members
Loose Tubes members
Oxcentrics members
Polar Bear (British band) members
Edition Records artists
Harmonia Mundi artists
Basho Records artists